Curse of Snakes Valley is a 1988 Polish-Soviet adventure film directed by Marek Piestrak.

Plot

Cast 
 Krzysztof Kolberger - Prof. Jan Tarnas
 Roman Wilhelmi - Captain Bernard Traven
 Ewa Sałacka - Christine
 Zbigniew Lesień - Noiret
 Leon Niemczyk - Man with black glasses
 Igor Przegrodzki - Breecher
 Zygmunt Bielawski - Morineau
 Henryk Bista - Reporter
 Sergei Desnitsky - Andriej Buturlin
 Mikk Mikiver - Director of organization
 Tõnu Saar - Saar

References

External links 

1980s science fiction adventure films
Soviet science fiction adventure films

Tallinnfilm films
Polish adventure films
Soviet science fiction horror films
Polish horror films
Polish science fiction films
Soviet multilingual films
1980s science fiction horror films
Polish multilingual films
1988 multilingual films